The Trent River is a river in southeastern Ontario which flows from Rice Lake to empty into the Bay of Quinte on Lake Ontario. This river is part of the Trent-Severn Waterway which leads to Georgian Bay. The Trent drains a large portion of south-central Ontario, including most of the Kawartha Lakes and their supplying watersheds.

The river is host to numerous species of birds, amphibians and fish. Some species of fish in the river include: Smallmouth bass, Largemouth bass, Pike, Walleye, Freshwater drums, Crappie as well as other smaller fish such as Sunfish, Rock Bass and Bluegill.

Located in traditional territory of the Mississauga Anishinaabek, Trent River's name in Ojibwe is both "zaagidawijiwanaang", and "Saugechewigewonk", meaning "Strong Rapids Waters".

Tributaries of this river include the Crowe River and the Otonabee River, which runs through the city of Peterborough, Ontario.
Trent University, located in Peterborough, is named after the region, and looked to provide university education to the area.

In 2008 water soldier plant was reported found along the shore line. The plant is imported from Europe. It is a common pond plant, purchased in garden stores. It has sharp leaves and is a possible concern as the plant spreads quickly using asexual reproduction.

See also 
 List of Ontario rivers
 Mephisto Lake
 The Murray Marsh

References

External links 

 Trent watershed maps
 Lower Trent Conservation
 Trent River, Geographical Name Search Service, Geographical Names Board of Canada

Rivers of Peterborough County
Tributaries of Lake Ontario
Trent–Severn Waterway